Alexandra Winifred Illmer Forsythe (May 20, 1918 – January 2, 1980) was an American computer scientist best known for co-authoring a series of computer science textbooks during the 1960s and 1970s, including the first ever computer science textbook, Computer Science: A First Course, in 1969.

Biography 
Forsythe was born in Newton, Massachusetts and raised in Cortland, New York. She attended Swarthmore College, where she met her future husband George Forsythe, and earned her bachelor's degree in mathematics. She and George were both accepted to the PhD program in mathematics at Brown University. Although an exceptional student, she was unable to continue in the program because the dean did not approve of female mathematicians and cut her fellowship support. She eventually left Brown and completed her master's degree at Vassar College in 1941 while serving as an instructor.

In 1969, Forsythe published Computer Science: A First Course. In 1975, she published a second edition. In 1978, Forsythe and a co-author, E. I. Organick, published Programming Language Structures.

Forsythe taught at Stanford and the University of Utah.

Alexandra Forsythe was married to George Forsythe and helped establish the computer science program at Stanford University.

Books

References 

1918 births
1980 deaths
American computer scientists
Swarthmore College alumni
Vassar College alumni
Stanford University faculty
University of Utah faculty
People from Boston
People from Cortland, New York
American women computer scientists
20th-century American women scientists
Computer science educators
American Quakers
Scientists from New York (state)
American women academics
20th-century Quakers